Nicholas White may refer to:

Nicholas White (lawyer) (c. 1532–1592), Irish lawyer, judge, privy councillor and government official
Nicholas White (martyr) (died 1557), English Protestant martyr
Nicholas White (physician) (born 1951), British tropical medicine doctor
Nicholas White (South African cyclist) (born 1974), South African cyclist
Nicholas White (Australian cyclist) (born 1997), Australian cyclist
Nic White (born 1990), Australian rugby union player
Nicholas White, man who was trapped in an elevator for 41 hours in 1999
Nicholas White, creator and editor of the internet culture magazine The Daily Dot
Nick White, American pianist in the band Tilly and the Wall